Columbia Township, Ohio, may refer to:

Columbia Township, Hamilton County, Ohio
Columbia Township, Lorain County, Ohio
Columbia Township, Meigs County, Ohio

Ohio township disambiguation pages